Somalis are an ethnic group in the Minneapolis–Saint Paul metropolitan area that makes up the largest Somali diasporas in the United States. By 2018, approximately 43,000 people born in Somalia were living in Minnesota, and approximately 94,000 Minnesotans spoke Somali, Amharic, or a related language at home.

History
Ethnic Somalis first emigrated to the Twin Cities as voluntary migrants in the 1980s and earlier. Other Somalis arrived in the United States after the start of the civil war in Somalia during the early 1990s, or from other parts of Greater Somalia. Many of the newer arrivals moved to Minnesota through voluntary agencies (VOLAGS), who helped them settle in. Somalis who had arrived earlier also assisted the more recent immigrants.

Somalis in the Twin Cities and elsewhere in the United States often send resources to their extended families abroad, remittances that were facilitated by the signing of the Money Remittances Improvement Act. Following a greatly improved security situation in Somalia in 2012, many Somali U.S. residents have also begun returning to Mogadishu and other parts of the country. A few of the homeward-bound immigrants along with some American-born associates have been sought and/or prosecuted for allegedly providing material support to the Al-Shabaab and Islamic State political militant groups. However, according to intelligence officials, fewer expatriates were joining the groups' ranks by late 2013. Most of the returnees have instead repatriated for investment opportunities and to take part in the ongoing post-conflict reconstruction process in Somalia. Participating in the renovation of schools, hospitals, roads and other infrastructure, they have played a leading role in the capital's recovery and have also helped propel the local real estate market.

Demographics
In early 2016, the Minnesota Demographers Office gave an estimate that there are between 40,200 and 52,400 Somalis in Minnesota, although some from the Somali community put the number as high as 80,000. These estimates include people born in Somalia and of Somalia descent.  Somalis in Minnesota reside throughout the Twin Cities metropolitan area and the surrounding towns. Many Somalis inhabit Minneapolis' Cedar-Riverside neighborhood, particularly newly arrived immigrants. Somali professionals often move to the suburbs to raise their children in a more secure environment away from the inner city. Although Somalis have established ethnic enclaves, there is an easy commute between Somali areas and the wider metropolis.

Commerce

Somalis in Minnesota have established many community enterprises. In 2006, they accounted for $164–$494 million in purchasing power and owned 600 businesses. Minneapolis in particular hosts hundreds of Somali-owned and operated commercial ventures. Stalls inside several Somali shopping malls (carmal mall, etc.) offer everything from halal meat, to leather shoes, to clothing for men and women, as well as gold jewelry, money transfer or hawala offices, banners advertising  Somali films, video rental stores fully stocked with nostalgic love songs not found in the mainstream supermarkets, groceries and boutiques. Workplaces in the state have in turn grown more culturally sensitive and accommodating of differing religious traditions. In 2018, Minneapolis officials named a new, innovative shared-use pathway near downtown Samatar Crossing in recognition of the Somalia-born Hussein Samatar's many civic contributions to Minneapolis.

Community organizations
The Somali community in Minnesota is represented by various Somali-run organizations. Among these are the Confederation of Somali Community in Minnesota (CSCM) and Somali American Parent Association (SAPA), which offer a number of social services to the state's resident Somalis.

This support system within the Somali community originates from a sense of shared responsibility towards other Somalis. The Somali community organizations provide ESL classes, job finding, legal advocacy and union services to their constituents.

In October 2014, Minneapolis became the sister city of Bosaso, the third-largest city in Somalia.

Politics

Politically, a Somali American Caucus in the Minnesota Democratic–Farmer–Labor Party (DFL) was formed to represent the Somali community.  a Somali American also chaired the Republican Party's Immigrant Relations Committee in Minnesota.

In August 2018, Ilhan Omar won the Democratic primary for Minnesota's 5th congressional district. In November 2018, she was elected to the US House of Representatives, becoming the first Somali-American elected to Congress.

Notable residents

Abdirizak Haji Hussein  Former Prime Minister of Somalia 1964-1968
Abdi Warsame, politician, member of the Minneapolis City Council
Abdirizak Bihi, social activist
Anisa Hajimumin, politician, Minister of Women & Family Affairs of Puntland
Fathia Absie, broadcaster, writer and filmmaker
Nuruddin Farah, writer
Saado Ali Warsame, singer-songwriter
Sahra Noor, social activist and entrepreneur
Ilhan Omar, politician, member of US House of Representatives
Isra Hirsi, Climate Change Activist
Hussein Samatar, politician, banker and community organizer.

See also

Little Somalia
Killing of Dolal Idd
Shooting of Justine Damond

References

Notes

Further reading

External links
Confederation of Somali Community in Minnesota (CSCM)
Somali Action Alliance

Somalis
Somalis
Minneapolis